The Fabelmans is a 2022 American coming-of-age drama film directed by Steven Spielberg, who co-wrote and co-produced it with Tony Kushner. The film is a semi-autobiographical story loosely based on Spielberg's adolescence and first years as a filmmaker. It's told through an original story of the fictional Sammy Fabelman, a young aspiring filmmaker who explores how the power of films can help him see the truth about his dysfunctional family and those around him. It stars Gabriel LaBelle as Sammy, alongside Michelle Williams, Paul Dano, Seth Rogen, and Judd Hirsch in supporting roles. The film is dedicated to the memories of Spielberg's real-life parents, Leah Adler and Arnold Spielberg, who died in 2017 and 2020 respectively.

Spielberg had conceived the project as early as 1999, with his sister Anne writing a screenplay titled I'll Be Home. The project was withheld for 20 years, since Spielberg had reservations about exploring his family's story over concerns that his parents would be hurt. Spielberg revisited the project in 2019 with screenwriter and frequent collaborator Kushner while they were making West Side Story, and the screenplay was completed in late 2020. Development of the film officially began soon after, with casting taking place between March and May 2021. Principal photography began that July in Los Angeles and wrapped in September.

The Fabelmans premiered at the Toronto International Film Festival on September 10, 2022, where it won the People's Choice Award. Distributed by Universal Pictures, the film opened as a limited theatrical release in the United States on November 11, 2022, and then expanded to a wide release on November 23. It underperformed and was labeled a box-office bomb, grossing only $40.8 million against a $40 million budget. The film received widespread critical acclaim, however, with praise directed towards the performances of the cast (particularly LaBelle, Williams, Dano and Hirsch), Spielberg's direction, the screenplay, cinematography, and John Williams' score. It was named one of the top ten films of 2022 by the National Board of Review and the American Film Institute.

The film received seven nominations at the 95th Academy Awards, including Best Picture, five nominations at the 80th Golden Globe Awards, winning Best Motion Picture – Drama and Best Director for Spielberg, and received 11 nominations at the 28th Critics' Choice Awards, including Best Picture, winning Best Young Performer for LaBelle, and two nominations at the 29th Screen Actors Guild Awards including Best Ensemble Cast of a Motion Picture and Best Supporting Actor (for Dano). It also received 2 awards from the National Board of Review, including Best Director for Spielberg and Breakthrough Performance for LaBelle (shared with Danielle Deadwyler for Till), making this the second Spielberg film to win both of these awards together since 1987's Empire of the Sun. With his 53rd nomination for Best Original Score with this film, John Williams broke his own record as the most Oscar-nominated person alive at the age of 90. With his Oscar nomination for Best Supporting Actor, Judd Hirsch became the first actor to receive two nominations over four decades apart, with this being his second nomination and first since the 53rd Academy Awards in 1981, where he was nominated for Ordinary People (1980).

Accolades

Notes

References

External links 
 

Fabelmans, The